John Mullen may refer to:
John Mullen (catcher), baseball player
John Mullen (baseball executive) (died 1991)
John J. Mullen (American football), football coach
John J. Mullen (mayor), politician
John Joseph Mullen, member of the Queensland Legislative Council
John Kernan Mullen, Irish-American businessman, philanthropist
John A. Mullen, American judge

See also
Jack Mullens (John Michael Mullens, 1896–1978), Australian politician
John McMullen (disambiguation)